Raef Morrison (born 1995) is a Hong Kong rugby union player.

Career
Morrison plays for the Hong Kong national rugby sevens team.

References

1995 births
Hong Kong rugby union players
Living people
Hong Kong international rugby sevens players
Alumni of West Island School